The 69th District of the Iowa House of Representatives in the state of Iowa.

Current elected officials
Kirsten Running-Marquardt is the representative currently representing the district.

Past representatives
The district has previously been represented by:
 Arthur A. Small, 1971–1973
 Norman Roorda, 1973–1975
 Robert T. Anderson, 1975–1983
 Robert J. Grandia, 1983–1987
 David F. Schrader, 1987–1993
 John Connors, 1993–2003
 Kent A. Kramer, 2003–2005
 Walt Tomenga, 2005–2009
 Erik Helland, 2009–2013
 Kirsten Running-Marquardt, 2013–present

References

069